Science and Theology: An Introduction is a 1998 book written by the English physicist, theologian, and Anglican priest John Polkinghorne.

References 

1998 non-fiction books
Books about religion and science
Christian theology books
English non-fiction books
English-language books